Hosack is a surname. Notable people with the surname include:

 Aaron Hosack (born 1981), American football player
 David Hosack (1769–1835), American physician
 J. C. Hosack, Scottish rugby union player